The 1961 Ohio State Buckeyes football team represented the Ohio State University in the 1961 Big Ten Conference football season. The Buckeyes compiled an 8–0–1 record and finished No. 2 in the final AP and UPI/Coaches' Polls. They were awarded the national championship by the Football Writers Association of America (FWAA).  This was the Buckeyes fourth national championship and the third for head coach Woody Hayes. The Alabama Crimson Tide was voted national champions by the AP and Coaches' Polls.

Days after the conclusion of the regular season, the university's faculty council voted down participation in the Rose Bowl, which then went to No. 6 Minnesota, Big Ten runner-up. A growing conflict between academics and athletics over Ohio State's reputation as a "football school" resulted in the faculty's decision to turn down an invitation to the Rose Bowl, resulting in much public protest and debate.

Schedule

Personnel

Game summaries

TCU

UCLA

Illinois

Northwestern

Wisconsin

Iowa

Indiana

Oregon

Michigan

Depth chart

Coaching staff
 Woody Hayes – Head Coach – 11th year

1962 Pro draftees

References

Ohio State
Ohio State Buckeyes football seasons
College football national champions
Big Ten Conference football champion seasons
College football undefeated seasons
Ohio State Buckeyes football